The FIDE Women's Grand Swiss Tournament 2021 was a chess tournament that forms part of the qualification cycle for the Women's World Chess Championship 2022. It was an 11-round Swiss-system tournament, with up to 50 players competing, ran from 27 October to 7 November 2021 in Riga, Latvia, in parallel with the FIDE Grand Swiss Tournament 2021. It was the first FIDE Women's Grand Swiss Tournament.

The top finisher who has not already qualified, qualified for the Women's Candidates Tournament 2022.

Qualifiers
The following 50 players will be invited:

 40 qualifiers by rating: the top 40 women by the average of the 12 rating lists from 1 July 2020 to 1 June 2021;
 4 places, one nominated by each of the four FIDE continental presidents;
 3 nominations of the FIDE president.
 3 nominations of the organizer, including 1 online qualifier.

In August 2021, FIDE announced the 40 top players by rating, as well as 20 reserves. 

The top four qualifiers by rating declined their invitations, including Aleksandra Goryachkina, Koneru Humpy and Ju Wenjun, who have no need to play, either through being Women's World Champion (Ju Wenjun), or having already qualified for the 2022 Women's Candidates Tournament. Goryachkina is instead playing in the Open Grand Swiss Tournament.

Tournament table 

{| class="wikitable" style="text-align: left" style="font-size:90%;"
|+ FIDE Women's Grand Swiss Tournament 2021 (Riga, 27.10.2021-07.11.2021)
|-
! Place !! Name !! Rating !! 1 !! 2 !! 3 !! 4 !! 5 !! 6 !! 7 !! 8 !! 9 !! 10 !! 11 !! Points !! TB1 !! TB2 !! TB3
|-
| 1. || align=left |  || 2505 || 24b1 || 23w1 || 2b½ || 26w1 || 18b½ || 11w1 || 17b1 || 19w1 || 8b1 || 4w½ || 3b½ || 9 || 64,5 || 70 || 56
|-
| 2. || align=left |  || 2475 || 12w1 || 33b1 ||  1w½ || 18w½ ||  6b1 ||  3b½ ||  9w1 ||  8w½ ||  4b0 ||  5b½ || 10w1 || 7½ || 69,5 || 74,5 || 49,5
|-
| 3. || align=left |  || 2455 || 44b1 || 32w1 || 17b½ ||  5w½ || 19b1 ||  2w½ ||  8b0 ||  4w½ ||  9w1 ||  6b1 ||  1w½ || 7½ || 67,5 || 71,5 || 46,75
|-
| 4. || align=left |  || 2536 || 35b½ || 10w½ ||  7b½ || 21w½ || 24b1 || 18w1 ||  6w½ ||  3b½ ||  2w1 ||  1b½ ||  5w½ || 7 || 69 || 74 || 46,5
|-
| 5. || align=left |  || 2511 || 39w½ || 46b1 || 22w1 ||  3b½ ||  9w½ || 17w½ || 11b½ ||  7w½ || 19b1 ||  2w½ ||  4b½ || 7 || 64,5 || 68,5 || 42,25
|-
| 6. || align=left |  || 2446 || 45w1 ||  8b½ || 20w1 || 25b½ ||  2w0 || 26w1 ||  4b½ || 18w½ ||  7b1 ||  3w0 || 17b1 || 7 || 64,5 || 68,5 || 41
|-
| 7. || align=left |  || 2438 || 49w1 || 20b½ ||  4w½ || 41b½ || 28w1 ||  9b0 || 21w1 ||  5b½ ||  6w0 || 33b1 || 12w1 || 7 || 61 || 63 || 37,25
|-
| 8. || align=left |  || 2518 || 47b1 ||  6w½ || 26b½ || 10w1 || 17b0 || 14w1 ||  3w1 ||  2b½ ||  1w0 ||  9b½ || 13w½ || 6½ || 68,5 || 72,5 || 41
|-
| 9. || align=left |  || 2467 || 43b1 || 28w1 || 18b½ || 17w½ ||  5b½ ||  7w1 ||  2b0 || 11w1 ||  3b0 ||  8w½ || 14b½ || 6½ || 66 || 70,5 || 39,5
|-
| 10. || align=left |  || 2400 || 27w½ ||  4b½ || 13w1 ||  8b0 || 22w1 || 29b½ || 25b1 || 17w½ || 18b½ || 20w1 ||  2b0 || 6½ || 62,5 || 68 || 39
|-
| 11. || align=left |  || 2428 || 46w½ || 39b½ || 30w1 || 45b1 || 27w1 ||  1b0 ||  5w½ ||  9b0 || 15w½ || 16b½ || 21w1 || 6½ || 61 || 65 || 35,25
|-
| 12. || align=left |  || 2382 || 2b0 || 25w0 || 34b0 || 50w1 || 47b1 || 31w1 || 26b1 || 20w1 || 17b½ || 18w1 ||  7b0 || 6½ || 58 || 58,5 || 30,5
|-
| 13. || align=left |  || 2433 || 14b½ || 40w½ || 10b0 || 42b1 || 44w1 || 20w1 || 19b0 || 22b½ || 39w1 || 17w½ ||  8b½ || 6½ || 57 || 61 || 33,75
|-
| 14. || align=left |  || 2322  || 13w½ || 36b½ || 46w1 || 28b½ || 25w½ ||  8b0 || 45w1 || 16b½ || 22w½ || 39b1 ||  9w½ || 6½ || 56,5 || 60,5 || 33,25
|-
| 15. || align=left |  || 2410 || 18b0 || 34w1 || 32b½ || 37w1 || 26b½ || 19w0 || 40b½ || 25w1 || 11b½ || 27w½ || 24b1 || 6½ || 55,5 || 60 || 34,5
|-
| 16. || align=left |  || 2447 || 32b0 || 44w0 || 31b½ || 48w1 || 40b½ || 43w1 || 24b1 || 14w½ || 29b½ || 11w½ || 27b1 || 6½ || 53 || 55,5 || 32,25
|-
| 17. || align=left |  || 2484 || 30w1 || 29b1 ||  3w½ ||  9b½ ||  8w1 ||  5b½ ||  1w0 || 10b½ || 12w½ || 13b½ ||  6w0 || 6 || 68,5 || 74 || 37,75
|-
| 18. || align=left |  || 2524 || 15w1 || 21b1 ||  9w½ ||  2b½ ||  1w½ ||  4b0 || 35w1 ||  6b½ || 10w½ || 12b0 || 22w½ || 6 || 68,5 || 73,5 || 38,75
|-
| 19. || align=left |  || 2493 || 28w0 || 43b1 || 42w1 || 44b1 ||  3w0 || 15b1 || 13w1 ||  1b0 ||  5w0 || 21b0 || 29w1 || 6 || 62,5 || 66,5 || 31,5
|-
| 20. || align=left |  || 2509 || 42b1 ||  7w½ ||  6b0 || 24w½ || 41w1 || 13b0 || 33w1 || 12b0 || 35w1 || 10b0 || 32w1 || 6 || 58,5 || 63 || 30,25
|-
| 21. || align=left |  || 2423 || 34b1 || 18w0 || 40b½ ||  4b½ || 45w1 || 25w½ ||  7b0 || 30w1 || 27b½ || 19w1 || 11b0 || 6 || 58,5 || 62,5 || 31,75
|-
| 22. || align=left |  || 2475 || 40b½ || 31w1 ||  5b0 || 32w½ || 10b0 || 44w1 || 34b1 || 13w½ || 14b½ || 29w½ || 18b½ || 6 || 58 || 62 || 31,5
|-
| 23. || align=left |  || 2420 || 48w1 ||  1b0 || 41w0 || 30b½ || 38w½ || 45b½ || 28w1 || 39b0 || 40w1 || 32b½ || 33w1 || 6 || 52,5 || 55 || 27,25
|-
| 24. || align=left |  || 2406 || 1w0 || 48b1 || 27w½ || 20b½ ||  4w0 || 38b1 || 16w0 || 42b½ || 34w1 || 36b1 || 15w0 || 5½ || 60 || 62,5 || 25,5
|-
| 25. || align=left |  || 2507 || 33w0 || 12b1 || 39w1 ||  6w½ || 14b½ || 21b½ || 10w0 || 15b0 || 32w½ || 28b½ || 42w1 || 5½ || 59 || 63,5 || 30,5
|-
| 26. || align=left |  || 2462 || 38w1 || 41b1 ||  8w½ ||  1b0 || 15w½ ||  6b0 || 12w0 || 46b1 || 33w0 || 40b½ || 39w1 || 5½ || 59 || 63 || 26,75
|-
| 27. || align=left |  || 2491 || 10b½ || 35w½ || 24b½ || 40w1 || 11b0 || 30w½ || 32b½ || 34w1 || 21w½ || 15b½ || 16w0 || 5½ || 58 || 62,5 || 29,5
|-
| 28. || align=left |  || 2402 || 19b1 ||  9b0 || 36w1 || 14w½ ||  7b0 || 34w0 || 23b0 || 38b1 || 42w½ || 25w½ || 43b1 || 5½ || 57 || 61,5 || 28,75
|-
| 29. || align=left |  || 2419 || 50b1 || 17w0 || 44b0 || 31w1 || 32b½ || 10w½ || 30b½ || 40w1 || 16w½ || 22b½ || 19b0 || 5½ || 55,5 || 56 || 25,25
|-
| 30. || align=left |  || 2397 || 17b0 || 50w1 || 11b0 || 23w½ || 36b1 || 27b½ || 29w½ || 21b0 || 37w½ || 47w1 || 31b½ || 5½ || 55 || 55,5 || 23,25
|-
| 31. || align=left |  || 2339 || 36w½ || 22b0 || 16w½ || 29b0 || 42w1 || 12b0 || 49w1 || 33b0 || 50w1 || 35b1 || 30w½ || 5½ || 51,5 || 52 || 20,5
|-
| 32. || align=left |  || 2371 || 16w1 ||  3b0 || 15w½ || 22b½ || 29w½ || 33b½ || 27w½ || 35b½ || 25b½ || 23w½ || 20b0 || 5 || 60 || 65 || 29
|-
| 33. || align=left |  || 2409 || 25b1 ||  2w0 || 37b½ || 36w½ || 34b½ || 32w½ || 20b0 || 31w1 || 26b1 ||  7w0 || 23b0 || 5 || 58 || 63 || 26,5
|-
| 34. || align=left |  || 2289 || 21w0 || 15b0 || 12w1 || 39b1 || 33w½ || 28b1 || 22w0 || 27b0 || 24b0 || 41w½ || 47b1 || 5 || 55,5 || 59,5 || 25,25
|-
| 35. || align=left |  || 2411 ||  4w½ || 27b½ || 45w0 || 38b½ || 37b1 || 41w1 || 18b0 || 32w½ || 20b0 || 31w0 || 49b1 || 5 || 53,5 || 55,5 || 22,75
|-
| 36. || align=left |  || 2441 || 31b½ || 14w½ || 28b0 || 33b½ || 30w0 || 49b½ || 38w½ || 41b½ || 46w1 || 24w0 || 44b1 || 5 || 51 || 53 || 22,25
|-
| 37. || align=left |  || 2450 || 41w0 || 38b1 || 33w½ || 15b0 || 35w0 || 39b0 || 48w1 || 45b½ || 30b½ || 44w½ || 46w1 || 5 || 48 || 50,5 || 20,75
|-
| 38. || align=left |  || 2380 || 26b0 || 37w0 || 50b1 || 35w½ || 23b½ || 24w0 || 36b½ || 28w0 || 44b½ || 48w1 || 45b1 || 5 || 48 || 48,5 || 17
|-
| 39. || align=left |  || 2409 ||  5b½ || 11w½ || 25b0 || 34w0 || 43b½ || 37w1 || 41b1 || 23w1 || 13b0 || 14w0 || 26b0 || 4½ || 58 || 62,5 || 24,5
|-
| 40. || align=left |  || 2392 || 22w½ || 13b½ || 21w½ || 27b0 || 16w½ || 46b1 || 15w½ || 29b0 || 23b0 || 26w½ || 50b½ || 4½ || 58 || 58,5 || 22,75
|-
| 41. || align=left |  || 2376 || 37b1 || 26w0 || 23b1 ||  7w½ || 20b0 || 35b0 || 39w0 || 36w½ || 47b0 || 34b½ || 48w1 || 4½ || 53 || 55,5 || 22
|-
| 42. || align=left |  || 2409 || 20w0 || 49b1 || 19b0 || 13w0 || 31b0 || 47w1 || 44b1 || 24w½ || 28b½ || 43w½ || 25b0 || 4½ || 53 || 55 || 17,75
|-
| 43. || align=left |  || 2381 || 9w0 || 19w0 || 48b½ || 49b1 || 39w½ || 16b0 || 46w0 || 50b1 || 45w1 || 42b½ || 28w0 || 4½ || 46 || 46,5 || 12,25
|-
| 44. || align=left |  || 2380 || 3w0 || 16b1 || 29w1 || 19w0 || 13b0 || 22b0 || 42w0 || 49b1 || 38w½ || 37b½ || 36w0 || 4 || 57,5 || 59,5 || 19
|-
| 45. || align=left |  || 2340 || 6b0 || 47w1 || 35b1 || 11w0 || 21b0 || 23w½ || 14b0 || 37w½ || 43b0 || 49w1 || 38w0 || 4 || 55,5 || 57,5 || 16,5
|-
| 46. || align=left |  || 2305 || 11b½ ||  5w0 || 14b0 || 47w½ || 48b1 || 40w0 || 43b1 || 26w0 || 36b0 || 50w1 || 37b0 || 4 || 51 || 51,5 || 12,75
|-
| 47. || align=left |  || 2410 ||  8w0 || 45b0 || 49w½ || 46b½ || 12w0 || 42b0 || 50w1 || 48b1 || 41w1 || 30b0 || 34w0 || 4 || 45 || 45,5 || 10,5
|-
| 48. || align=left |  || 2003 || 23b0 || 24w0 || 43w½ || 16b0 || 46w0 || 50b1 || 37b0 || 47w0 || 49w1 || 38b0 || 41b0 || 2½ || 47 || 47,5 || 4,75
|-
| 49. || align=left |  || 2328 ||  7b0 || 42w0 || 47b½ || 43w0 || 50b1 || 36w½ || 31b0 || 44w0 || 48b0 || 45b0 || 35w0 || 2 || 46 || 46,5 || 5
|-
| 50. || align=left |  || 1857 || 29w0 || 30b0 || 38w0 || 12b0 || 49w0 || 48w0 || 47b0 || 43w0 || 31b0 || 46b0 || 40w½ || ½ || 47,5 || 49,5 || 2,25
|}

External links 
Official website
"2021 FIDE Chess.com Women's Grand Swiss" in chess-results.com

References

FIDE Grand Swiss Tournament
Chess
2021 in chess
2021 in Latvian sport
October 2021 sports events in Europe
November 2021 sports events in Europe
Women's chess competitions
Chess in Latvia